The following outline is provided as an overview of and topical guide to Belarus:

Belarus is a landlocked country in Eastern Europe. Its strongest economic sectors are agriculture and manufacturing.

General reference

 Pronunciation:  
 Common English country name:  Belarus
 Official English country name:  The Republic of Belarus
 Common endonym(s):  
 Official endonym(s):  
 Adjectival(s): Belarusian
 Demonym(s):
 Etymology: Name of Belarus
 International rankings of Belarus
 ISO country codes: BY, BLR, 112
 ISO region codes: See ISO 3166-2:BY
 Internet country code top-level domain: .by
Internet Internationalized country code top-level domain: .бел

Geography of Belarus

Geography of Belarus
 Belarus is: a landlocked country
 Location:
 Northern Hemisphere and Eastern Hemisphere
 Eurasia
 Europe
 Eastern Europe
 Time zone:  Eastern European Time (UTC+02), Eastern European Summer Time (UTC+03)
 Extreme points of Belarus
 High:  Dzyarzhynskaya Hara 
 Low:  Neman River 
 Land boundaries:  3,306 km
 959 km
 891 km
 680 km
 605 km
 171 km
 Coastline:  none
 Population of Belarus: 9,255,524 (2022) - 96th most populous country

 Area of Belarus:  - 85th largest country
 Atlas of Belarus

Environment of Belarus

 Climate of Belarus
 Renewable energy in Belarus
 Geology of Belarus
 Protected areas of Belarus
 Biosphere reserves in Belarus
 National parks of Belarus
 Wildlife of Belarus
 Fauna of Belarus
 Birds of Belarus
 Mammals of Belarus

Natural geographic features of Belarus
 Rivers of Belarus
 World Heritage Sites in Belarus

Regions of Belarus

Regions of Belarus

Administrative divisions of Belarus

Administrative divisions of Belarus
 Provinces of Belarus

Regions (Oblasts) of Belarus

Regions of Belarus
 Minsk
 Brest Oblast
 Gomel Oblast
 Grodno Oblast
 Mogilev Oblast
 Minsk Oblast
 Vitebsk Oblast

Districts of Belarus

Districts of Belarus
There are 118 districts in Belarus.

Municipalities of Belarus

Municipalities of Belarus

Demography of Belarus

Demographics of Belarus

Government and politics of Belarus

 Form of government: presidential republic
 Capital of Belarus: Minsk
 Elections in Belarus
 Political parties in Belarus

Branches of government

Government of Belarus

Executive branch of the government of Belarus
 Head of state: President of Belarus
 Head of government: Prime Minister of Belarus
 Cabinet of Belarus

Legislative branch of the government of Belarus
 Parliament of Belarus (bicameral)
 Upper house: Council of the Republic
 Lower house: House of Representatives of Belarus

Judicial branch of the government of Belarus

Court system of Belarus
 Supreme Court of Belarus

Foreign relations of Belarus

Foreign relations of Belarus
 Diplomatic missions in Belarus
 Diplomatic missions of Belarus
 United States-Belarus relations

International organization membership
The Republic of Belarus is a member of:

 Black Sea Economic Cooperation Zone (BSEC) (observer)
 Central European Initiative (CEI)
 Collective Security Treaty Organization (CSTO)
 Commonwealth of Independent States (CIS)
 Eurasian Economic Community (EAEC)
 Euro-Atlantic Partnership Council (EAPC)
 European Bank for Reconstruction and Development (EBRD)
 Food and Agriculture Organization (FAO)
 General Confederation of Trade Unions (GCTU)
 International Atomic Energy Agency (IAEA)
 International Bank for Reconstruction and Development (IBRD)
 International Civil Aviation Organization (ICAO)
 International Criminal Police Organization (Interpol)
 International Development Association (IDA)
 International Federation of Red Cross and Red Crescent Societies (IFRCS)
 International Finance Corporation (IFC)
 International Labour Organization (ILO)
 International Mobile Satellite Organization (IMSO)
 International Monetary Fund (IMF)
 International Olympic Committee (IOC)
 International Organization for Migration (IOM)
 International Organization for Standardization (ISO)
 International Red Cross and Red Crescent Movement (ICRM)

 International Telecommunication Union (ITU)
 International Trade Union Confederation (ITUC)
 Inter-Parliamentary Union (IPU)
 Multilateral Investment Guarantee Agency (MIGA)
 Nonaligned Movement (NAM)
 Nuclear Suppliers Group (NSG)
 Organization for Security and Cooperation in Europe (OSCE)
 Organisation for the Prohibition of Chemical Weapons (OPCW)
 Partnership for Peace (PFP)
 Permanent Court of Arbitration (PCA)
 United Nations (UN)
 United Nations Conference on Trade and Development (UNCTAD)
 United Nations Educational, Scientific, and Cultural Organization (UNESCO)
 United Nations Industrial Development Organization (UNIDO)
 Universal Postal Union (UPU)
 World Customs Organization (WCO)
 World Federation of Trade Unions (WFTU)
 World Health Organization (WHO)
 World Intellectual Property Organization (WIPO)
 World Meteorological Organization (WMO)
 World Tourism Organization (UNWTO)
 World Trade Organization (WTO) (observer)

Law and order in Belarus

Law of Belarus
 Capital punishment in Belarus
 Constitution of Belarus
 Crime in Belarus
 Human rights in Belarus
 Censorship in Belarus
 LGBT rights in Belarus
 Freedom of religion in Belarus
 Law enforcement in Belarus

Military of Belarus

Military of Belarus
 Command
 Commander-in-chief:
 Ministry of Defence of Belarus
 Forces
 Army of Belarus
 Navy of Belarus
 Air Force of Belarus
 Special forces of Belarus
 Military history of Belarus
 Military ranks of Belarus

Local government in Belarus

Local government in Belarus

History of Belarus

History of Belarus

 Military history of Belarus

Culture of Belarus

Culture of Belarus
 Architecture of Belarus
Belarusian Gothic
 Cuisine of Belarus
 Festivals in Belarus
 Languages of Belarus
 Media in Belarus
 Museums in Belarus
 National symbols of Belarus
 Coat of arms of Belarus
 Flag of Belarus
 National anthem of Belarus
 People of Belarus
 Prostitution in Belarus
 Public holidays in Belarus
 Records of Belarus
 Religion in Belarus
 Christianity in Belarus
 Hinduism in Belarus
 Islam in Belarus
 Judaism in Belarus
 Sikhism in Belarus
 World Heritage Sites in Belarus

Art in Belarus
 Art in Belarus
 Cinema of Belarus
 Literature of Belarus
 Music of Belarus
 Television in Belarus
 Theatre in Belarus

Sports in Belarus

Sports in Belarus
 Football in Belarus
 Belarus at the Olympics

Economy and infrastructure of Belarus

Economy of Belarus
 Economic rank, by nominal GDP (2007): 69th (sixty-ninth)
 Agriculture in Belarus
 Banking in Belarus
 National Bank of Belarus
 Communications in Belarus
 Internet in Belarus
 Internet censorship in Belarus
 Companies of Belarus
 Currency of Belarus: Rubel
 ISO 4217: BYR
 Energy in Belarus
 Energy policy of Belarus
 Oil industry in Belarus
 Healthcare in Belarus
 Mining in Belarus
 Belarus Stock Exchange
 Tourism in Belarus
 Transport in Belarus
 Airports in Belarus
 Rail transport in Belarus
 Roads in Belarus

Education in Belarus

Education in Belarus
The 2 leading establishments in the national education system:
 Academy of Public Administration under the aegis of the President of the Republic of Belarus
 Belarusian State University

See also

List of Belarus-related topics
Outline of Europe
Outline of Slavic history and culture
List of Slavic studies journals

References

External links

 Media
Belarus News and Analysis
Politics and News from Belarus
 News of Belarus

 Governmental websites
President's official site
Government of Belarus
Embassy of Belarus in the United States
E-Government in Belarus
Ministry of Foreign Affairs

 Informational/cultural
A Belarus Miscellany
The Virtual Guide to Belarus
Belarus Tourism and Travel Information
The 1st Belarusian Art Gallery
Contemporary Belarusian Art and Painting
Media in Belarus
Belarus. The World Factbook. Central Intelligence Agency.
 The World Bank in Belarus
 The health resort of Belarus
Photos of Belarus

 City and country maps
map of natural sightseeings in Belarus
Belarus, topographic map
General detail, downloadable PDF map of Belarus
Google maps Belarus

Belarus
Belarus